Belgian Rhapsody is a 2014 Belgian musical film directed by Vincent Bal.

Cast 
  - Elke
 Arthur Dupont - Hugues
  - Jozef Fonteyne
  - Andries

References

External links 

2010s musical films
Belgian musical films